Anda Pa'l Cará was a Spanish-language television program, a late-night talk and variety show from Puerto Rico. It started in 2000 on Tele Once (later Univision Puerto Rico) as a late night show with comedian Silverio Pérez as host, and later evolved into a more youth-oriented format with a focus on celebrity news and interviews.

The show usually featured interviews with artists and other personalities, music performances, celebrity news, curious facts, and comedy sketches, among other things. Aside of its regular hosts, the show featured a team of collaborators discussing opinions on a wide range of topics from sexuality, films, and the Internet.

Despite its hosting changes, the show remained one of the most successful in the island, edging its direct rival, No te Duermas, of Telemundo.

Show history

2000: Silverio Pérez
In 2000, Anda Pa'l Cara began, with Silverio Pérez as host. During this first year, Pérez focused more on a late night talk show format with a slight focus on political commentary. During this time the show counted with Gabriel Ferri as creative director.

2001-2003: Luis Raúl and Gricel Mamery
When Pérez left the show, most people thought its popularity would decline. However, the combination of new hosts - comedian Luis Raúl and Gricel Mamery - and their chemistry, kept the show alive on the charts.

During their run, the show changed its format to one more oriented to comedy sketches benefitting from Luis Raúl talent. He brought most of his well-known characters, and several new ones, to the show, infusing it with a lighter format.

2003-2005: Luis Raúl leaves
Again, when Luis Raúl left the show in 2003, many thought that audiences would reject the change. A long casting process ensued, and Venezuelan host Daniel Sarcos was picked to join Mamery. Known Puerto Rican host, Sonya Cortes, was also chosen to complete the trio of hosts. This decision angered many local celebrities, who argued the election of a foreign host over a Puerto Rican one. However, after a few months, legal problems concerning Sarcos visa didn't allow him to continue working, and Puerto Rican Rafael José was chosen to replace him.

José mostly kept the previous format intact doing comedy sketches, albeit with a slight turn into a more celebrity oriented show. Most audiences embraced the selection and the show kept performing well. José would remain in the show until 2006 when he left to work in the United States. The year before, Mamery had also left the show.

2006-2009: Youngest vision, Rony, Sonya and Alexandra
In 2005, when Mamery left the show, she was replaced by young host Alexandra Fuentes. Curiously enough, Fuentes used to play a parody of Mamery in the show Salvese Quien Pueda on WKAQ-TV. The following year, radio host, Rony the Hyper joined the cast in a transition move before José left the show.
This season was the most successful of the show's history. and was produced by:
Soraya Sanchez- Executive Producer,
Nelson Ruiz- Executive Producer,
Diana Matos- General Producer,
Michell Santiago-Associate Producer/ General Producer ( Covers the General Producer when she's absent),
Orlando Sanchez- Line Producer/ Associate Producer ( Covers the associate producers when she's absent),
Beatriz Oliveros- Producer,
Yamilin Rivera- Guest Producer,
Angel Mercado- Creative Producer,
Karoll Nieves- Exterior Producer,
Lisette Letriz- Editor Producer,
Javier Maldonado- Editor Producer,
Yesibel Perez- Producer,
Joselo Perez - Media Producer,
Maria Ramos- Production Assistance,
Alexis Gonzales - Production Assistance,
Mary Luz Cintron- Production Assistance.

During this recent run, the show has focused more on its celebrity section featuring more interviews to several celebrities and personalities. The sections of movies and sexuality have been given a more ample coverage as well. In 2008, known celebrity reporter Milly Cangiano was added to the team to collaborate with Ramón "Papo" Brenes, who has been working in the show since 2000.

2009: Alexandra and Sonya, Looking for a new host
Rony "The Hyper" left the TV program for personal reasons, and now, Alexandra and Sonya, will be conducting a series of auditions for actors, singers and public figures in Puerto Rico that have a desire to be the new driver Anda Pa'l Cara with Alexandra and Sonya for the new season of it. On December 28, 2009 Univision Puerto Rico informed that the program will come to an end on December 30, 2009 after 10 years.
The last season was produced by:
Executive Producer- Soraya Sanchez,
Maxi Paglia- General Producer,
Michell Santiago - Associate Producer,
Orlando Sanchez- Line Producer/ Associate Producer,
Karoll Nieves- Editor Producer,
Joselo Perez- Media Producer,
Yesibel Perez- Producer and Associate Producer of " Estan del Kra",
Rafael Perez- Production Assistance,
Maria Ramos- Production Assistance,
Alexis Gonzales - Production Assistance/ Editor Producer.

Co-Scheduling Anda Pal Cara
APC de Gala

Hosting by Alexandra Malagon; This program has a more serious mission that APC, Alexandra here, interview and goes to the depths of an artist, going back to his days of childhood and recalling the moments highest of his career, gives joys and surprises, but the best everything, is that people know more than what it is that person.

APC Se Chavó La Política

This is an area which combine comedy, with the proper policy analysis, in the face of the elections on November 4, an election that will be historic for our country, PUERTO RICO, to be able to see the candidates, candidates for any political seat, To discuss the problems that have Puerto Ricans, all this from a different perspective, new, agreed with political satire.

Hosts

Official hosts
 Silverio Pérez (2000)
 Luis Raúl and Gricel Mamery (2001–2003)
 Daniel Sarcos, Gricel Mamery and Sonya Cortés (2003)
 Rafael José, Gricel Mamery and Sonya Cortés (2004–2005)
 Rafael José, Alexandra Fuentes and Sonya Cortés (2005–2006)
 Rony, Alexandra Fuentes and Sonya Cortés (2006–2009)
 Alexandra Fuentes and Sonya Cortés (2009)
 Hector Marcano and Alexandra Fuentes (2009)
 Javier de Jesús, Alexandra Fuentes and Alí Warrington (2009)

Co-hosts (Collaborators)
 Félix Vélez (2000–2005)
 Lorell "Lucia" Crespo (2000–2009)
 Alexandra Malagon (Anda Pa'l Cara de Gala's host) (2007–2009)
 Glory Glou (2008–2009)
 Ramón "Papo" Brenes (2000–2009)
 Juanma Fernández Paris (2000–2009)
 Carmita Laboy (Sexologist) (2006–2009)
 Tita "La Tonya" Guerrero (2007–2009)
 Milly Cangiano (2008–2009)
 Harold Rosario (2009)
 Saudy Rivera (2009)
 David Benitez (2009)
 William Venegas (2009)
 Miguel Morales (2009)
 Linette Chico (2009)

See also
 WLII
 Univision Puerto Rico
 Galavision

External links
 Official Site

References

Puerto Rican television series
2000s Puerto Rican television series
2000 American television series debuts
2009 American television series endings
2000s American variety television series